Aglossa costiferalis is a species of snout moth in the genus Aglossa. It was described by Francis Walker in 1866. It is found in eastern North America.

References

Moths described in 1866
Pyralini
Moths of North America